Paul Whitsun-Jones (25 April 1923 – 14 January 1974) was a Welsh character actor.

Born in Newport in Monmouthshire, he was educated at Merchant Taylors' School in Northwood in Middlesex. He started his acting career in 1948 with two years at York Repertory Theatre. In the West End he appeared in The Moonraker at the Saville Theatre (1952), Dangerous Curves at the Garrick Theatre (1953), and played the Wazir in Kismet at the Stoll Theatre for two years from 1955 to 1957.

His early television appearances included Street Scene, The Last Tycoon, Love from Italy, Berkeley Square and Swedish Match King. He played the role of Mr. Bumble in the original West End production of the musical Oliver! (1960). He appeared in two Doctor Who stories: as Squire Edwards in The Smugglers (1966) and the Marshal of Solos in The Mutants (1972).

Whitsun-Jones had two children by his first wife, Joyce Winifred Rankine, whom he married in 1949 and later divorced, and two from his second wife, Sylvia E. Horswell, including the actress Henrietta Whitsun-Jones.

He died of appendicitis in London in 1974 aged 50.

Filmography

Television

References

External links
 
 Whitsun-Jones on the British Film Institute website

1923 births
1974 deaths
Deaths from appendicitis
Welsh male television actors
Welsh male film actors
Welsh male stage actors
People from Newport, Wales
20th-century Welsh male actors